180 Ebury Street in the Belgravia district of London was the home of the composer Wolfgang Amadeus Mozart and his family from 5 August 1764 to 24 September 1764 during the Mozart family's grand tour of Europe. 

The house was built in the early to mid-eighteenth century as part of a terrace.  Mozart composed his first symphony here in 1764.  The house has been listed at Grade I due to its association with Mozart.

The building is now marked with a London County Council plaque placed in 1939 to commemorate Mozart's residence.  The plaque was re-erected in 1951 following damage in the Second World War.

See also
Mozarthaus Vienna
20 Frith Street

References

Belgravia
Grade I listed buildings in the City of Westminster
Grade I listed houses in London
Houses completed in the 18th century
Houses in the City of Westminster
Wolfgang Amadeus Mozart